Kharak Kalan is a village in the Bhiwani district of the Indian state of Haryana. , the village had 2,444 households with a population of 12,605 of which 6,697 were male and 5,908 female.

Dadi Sati Jabade is the primary deity here, and the residents and visitors alike rejoice in the Basant Pachami Mela. 

There are many other religious places like Dadi Chhabilende, Harsiddhi Devi, Khatu Shyam Temple, Jahar Veer Goga Ji Temple, Arya Samaj Temple, Ancient Shiva Temple, etc.

Kharak is also known as the city of saints. Famous Nāgepīra Bābā (नागेपीर बाबा), the most beloved disciple of Lord Shiva Gorakshanath, on whose name is the birthplace of Shri Ranpat and Mandhata. There are camps (डेरे) of mahatmas (saints) all around the village, where all sorrows and pains vanish.

Kharak Kalan has its own hospital run by the charitable trust 'Seth Phulchand Memorial'. The attractiveness of the village is enhanced by a large number of ponds. There are three main areas in this village, viz. Rajyan pana, Khandan pana, Mamnan pana.

There are many other beautiful temples near Dadi Sati Jabde Temple.

References

Villages in Bhiwani district

3 Major areas in kharak according to National Rural Drinking Water Programme.